Chiangmaia is a genus of Southeast Asian dwarf spiders that was first described by Alfred Frank Millidge in 1995.  it contains only two species, both found in Thailand: C. rufula and C. sawetamali.

See also
 List of Linyphiidae species

References

Araneomorphae genera
Linyphiidae
Spiders of Asia